Sphingobacterium kitahiroshimense is a Gram-negative, exopolysaccharide-degrading, strictly aerobic and chemoheterotrophic bacterium from the genus of Sphingobacterium which has been isolated from soil from the city Kitahiroshima on Japan.

References

External links
Type strain of Sphingobacterium kitahiroshimense at BacDive -  the Bacterial Diversity Metadatabase

Sphingobacteriia
Bacteria described in 2008